Ramazanköy is a village in the Nazımiye District, Tunceli Province, Turkey. The village is populated by Kurds of the Arel tribe and had a population of 56 in 2021.

The hamlets of Çiçekli, Çömlek, Geven, Gevrek, Kayalı, Kızpınarı, Üçkonak and Yenimezraa are attached to the village.

References 

Villages in Nazımiye District
Kurdish settlements in Tunceli Province